Borja Sainz Eguskiza (born 1 February 2001) is a Spanish professional footballer who plays as a right winger for Turkish club Giresunspor.

Club career
Born in Leioa, Biscay, Basque Country, Sainz joined Athletic Bilbao's Lezama in 2012, from lowly locals AD Lagun Artea. In August 2017, he signed for Deportivo Alavés after refusing a contract renewal from the Lions.

On 2 September 2018, Sainz made his senior debut with the reserves at the age of just 17, playing the last three minutes in a 3–0 Tercera División home win against SD San Pedro. He scored his first senior goal on 7 October in a 2–0 home defeat of SD Beasain, and finished the campaign with five goals in 18 appearances.

Sainz made his first team – and La Liga – debut on 25 August 2019, coming on as a second-half substitute for Luis Rioja in a 0–0 home draw against RCD Espanyol; by doing so, he became the first player of the 21st century to appear for the senior side. He scored his first goal in the category on 18 June of the following year, netting the opener in a 2–0 home defeat of Real Sociedad.

On 5 August 2021, Sainz was loaned to Segunda División side Real Zaragoza for the season. On 28 July of the following year, he moved abroad for the first time in his career after signing for Giresunspor in Turkey.

Career statistics

Club

References

External links

2001 births
Living people
People from Greater Bilbao
Sportspeople from Biscay
Spanish footballers
Footballers from the Basque Country (autonomous community)
Association football wingers
La Liga players
Segunda División B players
Tercera División players
Deportivo Alavés B players
Deportivo Alavés players
Real Zaragoza players
Giresunspor footballers
Spain youth international footballers
Spanish expatriate footballers
Spanish expatriate sportspeople in Turkey
Expatriate footballers in Turkey